Sacred Ground is an album by David Murray released on the Canadian Justin Time label. Recorded in 2006 and released in 2007 the album features performances by Murray, Lafayette Gilchrist, Ray Drummond, and Andrew Cyrille which were composed for the soundtrack for Marco Williams' film Banished (2007) on American counties in the South and Midwest that expelled blacks between Reconstruction and the Great Depression. The album features Cassandra Wilson on two tracks singing lyrics composed by Ishmael Reed.

Reception
The Allmusic review by Thom Jurek awarded the album 4 stars stating "Sacred Ground is a journey in time, space, and sound, one rooted in all the lineages, and yet it is a further benchmark of Murray's own decidedly marked place within it, even as it points both forward and back -- just like Reed's writing and Wilson's singing.".

Track listing
 "Sacred Ground" (Murray, Reed) - 8:52  
 "Transitions" - 12:04  
 "Pierce City" - 9:05  
 "Banished" - 5:46  
 "Believe in Love" - 10:41  
 "Family Reunion" - 7:17  
 "The Prophet of Doom" (Murray, Reed) - 11:20  
All compositions by David Murray except as indicated  
Recorded October 20–21, 1997

Personnel
David Murray - tenor saxophone, bass clarinet
Lafayette Gilchrist - piano
Ray Drummond - bass
Andrew Cyrille - drums
Cassandra Wilson - vocals (track 1 & 7)

References 

2008 albums
David Murray (saxophonist) albums
Justin Time Records albums